Bolsover District is a local government district in Derbyshire, England. It is named after the town of Bolsover, which is near the geographic centre of the district, but the council is based in Clowne. At the 2011 Census, the district had a population of 75,866. The district is along with North East Derbyshire, Borough of Chesterfield and Bassetlaw District is a non-constituent member of the Sheffield City Region.

Town and parish councils
There are fourteen town and parish councils within the district.

In addition to the town councils of Old Bolsover and Shirebrook, there are the parish councils of: 
Ault Hucknall
Barlborough
Blackwell
Clowne
Elmton-with-Creswell
Glapwell
Hodthorpe and Belph
Pinxton
Pleasley
Scarcliffe
South Normanton
Tibshelf
Whitwell

Other settlements include Broadmeadows, Hilcote, Langwith, Old Blackwell, Newton, Palterton, Shirebrook and Westhouses.

The current district boundaries date from 1 April 1974, when the urban district of Bolsover was merged with Blackwell Rural District and Clowne Rural District.

Council

Bolsover District Council is elected every four years, with currently 37 councillors being elected at each election. The Labour Party had a majority on the council from the first election to the council in 1973 until 2019 and after the 2019 election the council was composed of the following councillors:

As of November 2020, the Conservatives have 3 councillors after a defection from the singular Lib Dem councillor, Natalie Hoy.

The Bolsover District and the nearby North East Derbyshire, Borough of Chesterfield and Bassetlaw District alongside the High Peak Borough and Derbyshire Dales district are non-constituent members of the wider Sheffield City Region.

References

 
Non-metropolitan districts of Derbyshire